Flash Gordon is a 1936 superhero serial film. Presented in 13 chapters, it is the first screen adventure for Flash Gordon, the comic-strip character created by Alex Raymond in 1934. It presents the story of Gordon's visit to the planet Mongo and his encounters with the evil Emperor Ming the Merciless. Buster Crabbe, Jean Rogers, Charles Middleton, Priscilla Lawson and Frank Shannon portray the film's central characters. In 1996, Flash Gordon was selected for preservation in the United States National Film Registry by the Library of Congress as being "culturally, historically, or aesthetically significant".

Chapter summaries
 "The Planet of Peril"
 The planet Mongo is on a collision course with Earth. Dr. Alexis Zarkov takes off in a rocket ship to Mongo with Flash Gordon and Dale Arden as his assistants. They find that the planet is ruled by the cruel Emperor Ming, who lusts after Dale and sends Flash to fight in the arena. Ming's daughter, Princess Aura, tries to spare Flash's life.
 "The Tunnel of Terror"
 Aura helps Flash to escape as Zarkov is put to work in Ming's laboratory and Dale is prepared for her wedding to Ming. Flash meets Prince Thun, leader of the Lion Men, and the pair return to the palace to rescue Dale.
 "Captured by Shark Men"
 Flash stops the wedding ceremony, but he and Dale are captured by King Kala, ruler of the Shark Men and a loyal follower of Ming. At Ming's order, Kala forces Flash to fight with a giant octosak in a chamber filling with water.
 "Battling the Sea Beast"
 Aura and Thun rescue Flash from the octosak. Trying to keep Flash away from Dale, Aura destroys the mechanisms that regulate the underwater city.
 "The Destroying Ray"
 Flash, Dale, Aura and Thun escape from the underwater city, but are captured by King Vultan and the Hawkmen. Dr. Zarkov befriends Prince Barin, and they race to the rescue.
 "Flaming Torture"
 Dale pretends to fall in love with King Vultan in order to save Flash, Barin and Thun, who are put to work in the Hawkmen's atomic furnaces.
 "Shattering Doom"
 Flash, Barin, Thun and Zarkov create an explosion in the atomic furnaces.
 "Tournament of Death"
 Dr. Zarkov saves the Hawkmen's city in the sky from falling, earning Flash and his friends King Vultan's gratitude. Ming insists that Flash fight a tournament of death against a masked opponent, revealed to be Barin, and then against a vicious orangopoid.
 "Fighting the Fire Dragon"
 Flash survives the tournament with Aura's help, after she discovers the weak point of the orangopoid. Still determined to win Flash, Aura has him drugged to make him lose his memory.
 "The Unseen Peril"
 Flash recovers his memory. Ming is determined to have Flash executed.
 "In the Claws of the Tigron"
 Zarkov invents a machine that makes Flash invisible. Flash torments Ming and his guards. Barin hides Dale in the catacombs, but Aura has her tracked by a tigron.
 "Trapped in the Turret"
 Aura realizes the error of her ways, and falls in love with Barin. She tries to help Flash and his friends to return to Earth — but Ming plots to kill them.
 "Rocketing to Earth"
 Ming orders that the Earth people be caught and killed, but Flash and his friends escape from the Emperor's clutches, and Ming is apparently killed in the flames of the "sacred temple of the Great God Tao". Flash, Dale and Zarkov make a triumphant return to Earth.

Cast

 Buster Crabbe as Flash Gordon
 Charles B. Middleton as Ming the Merciless
 Jean Rogers as Dale Arden
 Priscilla Lawson as Princess Aura
 Frank Shannon as Dr. Alexis Zarkov
 Richard Alexander as Prince Barin
 Jack Lipson as King Vultan
 Theodore Lorch as Second High Priest
 James Pierce as Prince Thun
 Duke York as King Kala
 Earl Askam as Officer Torch
 Lon Poff as First High Priest (uncredited)
 Richard Tucker as Professor Gordon
 George Cleveland as Professor Hensley
 Muriel Goodspeed as Zona

Cast notes:
 Eddie Parker served as a stand-in and stunt double for Buster Crabbe.
 Crash Corrigan, who would later star in other serials, wore a modified gorilla suit to portray the "orangopoid" seen in chapters 8 and 9.
 Glenn Strange in uncredited roles wore the "Gocko" lobster-clawed dragon costume and also appears as one of Ming's soldiers.
 Richard Alexander helped to design his own costume, which included a leather chest plate painted gold.
 Early film fan historians claimed that actor Lon Poff, playing the first of Ming's two high priests, died shortly after production began and was replaced by Theodore Lorch. In fact, however, only Poff's character died, or rather was killed by Ming in an act of fury and replaced by Lorch's High Priest, but the scene was cut from the final print. Poff did not die until 1952.

Production
 According to Harmon and Glut, Flash Gordon had a budget of over a million dollars. Stedman, however, writes that it was "reportedly" $350,000.
 Many props and other elements in the film were recycled from earlier Universal productions. The watchtower sets used in Frankenstein (1931) appear again as several interiors within Ming's palace. One of the large Egyptian statues seen in The Mummy (1932) is the idol of the Great God Tao. The laboratory set and a shot of the Moon rushing past Zarkov's returning rocket ship from space are from The Invisible Ray (1936). Zarkov's rocket ship and scenes of dancers swarming over a gigantic idol were reused from Just Imagine (1930). Ming's attack on Earth is footage from old silent newsreels, and an entire dance segment is from The Midnight Sun (1927), while some of the laboratory equipment came from Bride of Frankenstein (1935). The music was also recycled from several other films, notably Bride of Frankenstein, Bombay Mail, The Black Cat (both 1934), Werewolf of London (1935), and The Invisible Man (1933). 
 Crabbe had his hair dyed blond to appear more like the comic-strip Flash Gordon. He was reportedly very self-conscious about this and kept his hat on in public at all times, even with women present. He did not like men whistling at him. Jean Rogers also had her hair dyed blonde prior to production, "apparently to capitalize on the popularity of Jean Harlow". Brunette was actually the natural hair color for both actresses.
 According to the 1973 reference The Great Movie Serials: Their Sound and Fury by Jim Harmon and Donald Glut, Ming's makeup and costuming were designed to resemble Fu Manchu, a fictional "supervillain" popularized in earlier Hollywood films and in a series of novels first published in England in 1913.
 Exterior shots, such as the Earth crew's first steps on Mongo, were filmed at Bronson Canyon.

Release and reception
Universal hoped to regain an adult audience for serials with the release of Flash Gordon and by presenting it in many of the top or "A-level" theaters in large cities across the United States. Multiple newspapers in 1936, including some not even carrying the Flash Gordon comic strip, featured half- and three-quarter-page stories about the film as well as copies of Raymond's drawings and publicity stills that highlighted characters and chapter settings.

The film was the first outright science-fiction serial, although earlier serials had contained science-fiction elements such as gadgets. Six of the fourteen serials released within five years of Flash Gordon were science fiction.

For syndication to TV in the 1950s, the serial was renamed Space Soldiers, so as not to be confused with the newly made, also syndicated TV series, Flash Gordon.

The serial film was also edited into a 72-minute feature version in 1936, which was only exhibited abroad, until being released in the USA as 1949 as Rocket Ship by Sherman S. Krellberg's Filmcraft Pictures. 

A different feature version of the serial, at 90 minutes, was sold directly to television in 1966 under the title Spaceship to the Unknown.  

Flash Gordon was Universal's second-highest-grossing film of 1936, after Three Smart Girls, a musical starring Deanna Durbin. The Hays Office, however, objected to the revealing costumes worn by Dale, Aura and the other female characters. In response to those objections, Universal designed more modest outfits for the female performers in the film's two sequels.

In his review of the film in the 2015 reference Radio Times Guide to Films, Alan Jones describes Flash Gordon as "non-stop thrill-a-minute stuff as Flash battles one adversary after another", and he states that it is "the best of the Crabbe trilogy of Flash Gordon films".

Sequels
Two sequels to Flash Gordon, also in serial form and starring Buster Crabbe, followed the popular 1936 production: Flash Gordon's Trip to Mars (15 chapters) in 1938 and Flash Gordon Conquers the Universe (12 chapters) in 1940. Between the releases of those two later productions, Crabbe starred in an entirely separate but similarly structured Universal science-fiction serial portraying Buck Rogers, another popular character also featured in magazines, comic strips, and on radio in the late 1920s and 1930s.

See also
 1936 in science fiction

References

External links

 Flash Gordon essay by Roy Kinnard at National Film Registry 
 Flash Gordon essay by Daniel Eagan in America's Film Legacy: The Authoritative Guide to the Landmark Movies in the National Film Registry, A&C Black, 2010, pages 240-242 
 
 

1936 films
1930s science fiction action films
1930s science fiction adventure films
1930s superhero films
American black-and-white films
American science fiction action films
American space adventure films
American superhero films
1930s English-language films
Flash Gordon films
Films based on comic strips
Films directed by Ray Taylor 
Films set on fictional planets
Films set in New York City
Live-action films based on comics
United States National Film Registry films
Universal Pictures film serials
Films with screenplays by George H. Plympton
1930s American films